Edward Rothwell (3 September 1917 – 10 April 2000) was an English footballer who played in the Football League for Bolton Wanderers and Southport.

External links
 

English footballers
English Football League players
Bolton Wanderers F.C. players
Southport F.C. players
1917 births
2000 deaths
Association football forwards